Loho may refer to:

 Luohe, spelled as Loho in Chinese Postal Map Romanization, city in Henan, China
 Lower East Side, in New York City
 Loho Studios, a New York recording studio